Willow Creek is a stream in Calaveras County, California. It was the site of an arson fire in 2016.

References

Rivers of Calaveras County, California